Jeunesse Junglinster is a football club, based in Junglinster, Luxembourg. The women's football team has won the national championship Dames Ligue 1 in 2010, 2012, 2013  and 2015 as well as the Luxembourg Women's Cup in 2010, 2011, 2015. The men's team currently plays in the second tier Luxembourg Division of Honour.

References

External links
Official website

Junglinster
Women's football clubs in Luxembourg
Football clubs in Luxembourg